This glossary of evolutionary biology is a list of definitions of terms and concepts used in the study of evolutionary biology, population biology, speciation, and phylogenetics, as well as sub-disciplines and related fields. For additional terms from related glossaries, see Glossary of genetics, Glossary of ecology, and Glossary of biology.

A

B

C

D

E

F

G

H

I

J

K

L

M

N

O

P

Q

R

S

T

U

V

W

Y

See also
Outline of evolution
Index of evolutionary biology articles
Glossary of genetics (M−Z)

References

Evolutionary biology
Speciation
Glossaries of biology
Wikipedia glossaries using description lists